Louis Charles Jean Robert de Mazade (19 March 1820,  to Castelsarrasin, Tarn-et-Garonne – 27 April 1893, Paris) was a French historian, journalist, and political editor of Revue des deux mondes. He was the third member elected to occupy seat 4 of the Académie française in 1882.

References

External links
 

1820 births
1893 deaths
People from Castelsarrasin
19th-century French historians
Members of the Académie Française
19th-century French journalists
French male journalists
French male writers
19th-century French male writers